Leinong Naga, or Htang Ngan, is a Sino-Tibetan language spoken in Burma. Leinong Naga is spoken in about 25 villages of Lahe Township and northwestern Hkamti Township, Naga Self-Administered Zone (formerly administered as part of Hkamti District), Sagaing Division, Myanmar (Ethnologue). Dialects are Yao Dyang (Northern Leinong, Zau Dyang) and Southern Leinong (Ethnologue).

References

Sources
Wayesha, Ahsi James. 2010. A phonological description of Leinong Naga. M.A. dissertation. Chiang Mai: Payap University.

Sal languages
Languages of Myanmar